Wasatch Mountain State Park is a state park of Utah, United States, located in the northern part of the state within the Wasatch Back area on the north and west edges of the Heber Valley in Wasatch County near the city of Midway.

Description

Established in 1961, Wasatch Mountain State Park is Utah's most developed state park. Wildlife in the park includes deer, elk, wild turkeys, and moose. Although the southern part of Wasatch Mountain State Park is adjacent to the northeast part of Deer Creek State Park, the two parks only share a short section of common border.

Of the forty state parks in Utah, Wasatch Mountain State Park was the fifth most visited during the Fiscal Year 2017. During that period, 360,338 guests visited the park, representing a 6.7 percent increase over FY2016.

Park facilities
Wasatch Mountain State Park is used for mountain activities such as camping, picnicking, hiking, off-road vehicle use, horseback riding, Nordic skiing, snow tubing, and snowmobiling. It is also home to Wasatch Mountain and Soldier Hollow golf courses. Unlike a large majority of Utah's state parks, it is not related to a body of water (reservoir, lake, etc.).

There are 139 campsites at the park, along with two pavilions for group use, restrooms, showers, and utility hookups.

Soldier Hollow was host to some of the events of the 2002 Winter Olympics. The venue remains open to the public year-round, offering Nordic skiing, tubing, snowshoeing, a summer and winter biathlon, and in-line skating facilities.

Access
There are three sections of the park, each with a different access route. The main part of the park, including the park headquarters/visitors center, campgrounds, and the Wasatch Golf Course, is most easily reached via Utah State Route 222 (east Main Street) from Midway. It may also be accessed (except during the winter and early spring) by way of Pine Canyon Road from Guardsman Pass Road (from Big Cottonwood Canyon) or Utah State Route 224 (from Park City). The Soldier Hollow portion, which includes the cross country ski resort and the Soldier Hallow Golf Course, is most easily accessed by way of Tate Road (from Utah State Route 113 in Charleston) and then turning south on Stringtown Road. (Until 1990, this route was designated as Utah State Route 220.) Dutch Hollow, the least visited area, which includes a hiking trail, is reached via Dutch Canyon Road from River Road on the eastern edge of Midway.

History
Wasatch Mountain State Park contains three historic features. The restored Tate Barn, at the south end of the park, is a recognized landmark and Heber Valley symbol. It is a classic wooden barn built in the 1890s.  Huber Grove, a 100-year-old apple orchard, features the Huber Farmhouse and Creamery. The third feature is the Snake Creek Hydroelectric Power Plant Historic District. However, most facets of the district are currently not directly accessible by the public.

See also

 List of Utah State Parks

Notes

References

External links

 

Protected areas established in 1961
State parks of Utah
Protected areas of Wasatch County, Utah
Wasatch Range
1961 establishments in Utah